Colin Andrew Munro CMG (born 24 October 1946) is a former British diplomat.

He was educated at George Watson's College, the University of Edinburgh (MA Modern Languages, 1968) and King's College London (MA, International Studies). He served as British Ambassador to Croatia from 1997 to 2000.

Honours
  Companion of the Order of St Michael and St George (CMG) - 2002

References

1946 births
Living people
People educated at George Watson's College
Alumni of the University of Edinburgh
Alumni of King's College London
Ambassadors of the United Kingdom to Croatia